Ice hockey, sometimes referred to in the U.S. simply as "hockey", is a popular sport in the United States. Hockey in the U.S. began in 1894 when the first artificial ice rink was built in Baltimore, Maryland. Now hockey is most popular in regions of the U.S. with cold winter climates, such as the northeast and the upper Midwest. However, since the 1990s, ice hockey has become increasingly popular in the Sun Belt due in large part to the expansion of the National Hockey League to the southeast and southwest U.S., coupled with the mass relocation of many residents from northern cities with strong hockey support to these Sun Belt locations.

History of ice hockey in the United States

The contemporary sport of ice hockey was developed in Canada, most notably in Montreal, Quebec, where the first indoor hockey game was played on March 3, 1875. Some characteristics of that game, such as the length of the ice rink and the use of a puck, have been retained to this day. The game soon spread south through Canadian immigrants, who played the stick and ball game referred to as "shinny" on frozen ponds and lakes in the winter. The first organized game of this precursor to modern ice hockey in the United States was on November 17, 1883 on the Lower School Pond of St. Paul's School in Concord, NH. The first known formal game of ice hockey in the United States was subsequently played between Yale University and Johns Hopkins University in 1893, and is generally considered to be the start of present-day ice hockey in the nation.

In 1894, the first artificial ice rink was built in Maryland. The rink was called the North Avenue Ice Palace, which was located in Baltimore, Maryland. A few years later, in 1896, the first ice hockey league in the United States was formed called The U.S. Amateur Hockey League. It was founded in New York City around the same time as the second artificial ice rink was opened in New York, New York, called the St. Nicholas Arena. The U.S. Amateur Hockey League then became a member of the International Professional Hockey League in 1904. There were five teams from the United States and Ontario that formed the International Ice Hockey Federation. This league only lasted three seasons but it was the first professional ice hockey league that the United States participated in.

By 1898 the following leagues had already formed: the Amateur Hockey League of New York, the Amateur Hockey Association of Canada, and the Ontario Hockey Association. The 1898 Spalding Athletic Library book includes rules (laws) and results for each league (association).

Meanwhile, teams in western Canada formed the Pacific Coast Hockey Association in 1911. This league created new designs and rules that helped ice hockey evolve into the game it is today. Some of these new innovations that were created were blue lines that were painted under the ice which divided the ice into three sections, goaltenders are allowed to fall and slide on the ice to help prevent the other team from scoring a goal, forward passing is permitted in the neutral zone, and the game was split into three periods of 20 minutes. In 1912, the game changed again reducing the number of on-ice players to six players from the previous seven.

National Hockey League

The NHL is the major professional hockey league in North America, with 24 U.S.-based teams and 7 Canadian-based teams competing for the Stanley Cup. While NHL stars are still not as readily familiar to the general American public as are stars of the NFL, MLB, and the NBA, average attendance for NHL games in the U.S. has surpassed average NBA attendance in recent seasons, buoyed in part by the NHL Winter Classic being played in large outdoor stadiums.

In 1924, the Boston Bruins were the first American team to join the National Hockey League. During that season, the first NHL game was played in the United States where the Boston Bruins defeated the Montreal Maroons 2–1. That same season, the NHL increased the season schedule from 24 games to 30 games.  Three more American teams the New York Rangers, Chicago Black Hawks and Detroit Cougars, joined the NHL in the year 1926. That same year, the Western Hockey League fell apart and sold most of its players to the new NHL teams. This makes the NHL the top hockey league in North America. In 1942, the Brooklyn Americans withdrew from the NHL. This left the Canadiens, Maple Leafs, Red Wings, Bruins, Rangers, and Black Hawks as the only teams left in the NHL for the next 25 years. Those six teams are now called "the Original Six."

New Brunswick-born skater Willie O'Ree became the first black ice hockey player in the NHL for the Boston Bruins. while Val James was the first African American player to compete in the NHL for the Buffalo Sabres and Toronto Maple Leafs.

In 1972 the World Hockey Association formed of 12 teams from Canada and the United States intended to rival the NHL but ultimately failed and many of the teams merged with the NHL.

Stanley Cup
The Stanley Cup is the oldest trophy in North American sports. Lord Stanley of Preston was appointed by Queen Victoria to be the Governor General of Canada on June 11, 1888. While governor, Ice hockey was still just forming in Canada. He first got to see the game of hockey played at Montreal's 1889 Winter Carnival. During the carnival he watched the Montreal Victorias play the Montreal Hockey Club. Since then he and his family became very involved in the game of ice hockey. His two sons, Arthur and Algernon, convinced their father to donate a trophy that would be considered to be a visible sign of the ice hockey championship. This trophy was a silver bowl inlaid with gold.  The trophy was first presented in 1893 and was called the Dominion Hockey Challenge Cup. The name of the trophy was later changed to the famous name, The Stanley Cup.

In 1914 the Portland Rosebuds, an American-based team, joined the Pacific Coast Hockey Association. After that, the trustees of the Stanley Cup made a statement that the Stanley Cup was no longer for the best team in Canada, but now the best team in the whole world. The Rosebuds became the first American team to compete in the Stanley Cup Finals two years later. In the year 1917, the team Seattle Metropolitans was the first American team to win the Stanley Cup. Once that season was over, the National Hockey Association was changed into the NHL or the National Hockey League.

Minor leagues
Minor league professional hockey leagues in the U.S. include the American Hockey League and the ECHL. Additionally, nine U.S.-based teams compete in the three member leagues of the Canadian Hockey League.
USA Hockey is the official governing body for amateur hockey in the U.S. The United States Hockey Hall of Fame is located in Eveleth, Minnesota.

Ice hockey structure

The United States ice hockey structure includes elements from traditional American scholastic high school and college athletics, affiliated and independent minor leagues, and the unique "Major Junior" leagues. The hierarchy of the ice hockey league system forms a pyramid with a large number of regional minor and development leagues making up the base of the pyramid and a linear progression through the professional minor leagues leading to the Nation Hockey League at the top of the pyramid.

Amateur ice hockey
College hockey has a regional following in the northeastern and upper midwestern United States. It is increasingly being used to develop players for the NHL and other professional leagues (the U.S. has junior leagues, the United States Hockey League and North American Hockey League, but they are more restricted to protect junior players' college eligibility). The Frozen Four is college hockey's national championship.

Summer senior ice hockey is increasing in popularity in the 21st century, with Edina, Minnesota's Da Beauty League and Buffalo, New York's Fattey Hockey League both drawing NHL players who use the leagues to stay in shape during the offseason. Da Beauty League, established in 2016, is considered the nation's premier summer ice hockey league and benefits from corporate sponsorship from the Minnesota business community.
The GLHL is a travel, full-contact league that plays for the Kohlman Cup every year. Teams are all based in Wisconsin and the upper peninsula of Michigan. Several of the teams in the GLHL are the oldest hockey teams in the world, including the Portage Lake Pioneers and Calumet Wolverines, both established in the early 1900s.

Olympics

A hockey tournament debuted in the Summer Olympics in 1920 and would later also be recognized as the first World Ice Hockey Championship. Canada took the gold medal, with the United States getting the silver. The Canadians went on to claim three consecutive golds after the sport was permanently transferred to the newly established Winter Olympics in 1924. In 1936, their streak was ended by the British team that went on to beat the Canadians and tie the Americans, claiming the gold. Canada reclaimed gold in 1948 and defended it in 1952. However, the Soviet Union ended Canadian dominance in 1956, winning gold, and went on to win all Olympic tournaments until 1992 with 1960 and 1980, when the Americans were victorious, being lone exceptions. Much of this has to do with the fact that, unlike the Soviets, the Canadians were unable to use their best players. After 1992, four nations won gold medals: Canada (7th, 8th, and 9th titles), Sweden (1st and 2nd title), Czech Republic (1st title), Russia (9th title), and, the most recent champions, Finland (1st title). From 1998 to 2014, NHL players participated in the Olympics. In 1994, 2018, and 2022 players from all professional leagues except the NHL and AHL competed. Prior to 1947 there was no nationally recognized national governing body for ice hockey in the United States. The Amateur Hockey Association of the United States or AHAUS, which later became USA Hockey, was created that year and has remained the governing body of ice hockey in the United States since then. The United States men's team has won two gold medals (1960, 1980), eight silver medals (1920, 1924, 1932, 1952, 1956, 1972, 2002, 2010) and one bronze medal (1936). The 1980 gold medal victory is still remembered as one of the greatest upsets in sporting history, with team USA beating four-time defending champions the USSR in the medal round. The women's team has won two gold medals (1998, 2018), four silver medals (2002, 2010, 2014, 2022), and one bronze medal (2006).

Women's ice hockey

Women's ice hockey is less popular, but is growing. The Premier Hockey Federation, founded in 2015 as the National Women's Hockey League, is the first in the country to pay its players, and during its foundation featured four teams from the Northeast. Through partnerships with NHL teams, the league survived and expanded to five teams for its fourth season in 2018, adding the Minnesota Whitecaps (a long-established independent team) that year. Four of the league's five teams are owned and operated by the league itself; the lone exception is the Whitecaps. In 2019, a player strike led to two of the NHL partnerships being severed and one of the teams, the Buffalo Beauts, being placed into legal limbo after Pegula Sports and Entertainment (which had purchased the team in 2017) surrendered the NWHL franchise back to the league but not the intellectual property or arena lease. The player strike was brought on by a disconnect between the demands of the NWHL's players to be paid and treated more professionally than they have been, and the NWHL's inability to enter into the agreements necessary for those demands to be met.

In 2019-20, the then NWHL became an international league with the disbandment of its neighbor Canadian Women's Hockey League and the foundation of the first women's pro hockey team in Canada under the league's mantle, and in 2021 was renamed to its current name.

Television coverage

In 1957, CBS was the first U.S. television network to carry NHL games. Later, the television network NBC also started carrying some NHL games. Both television networks held rights to show NHL games at times, but neither television network showed a full NHL schedule. They only carried select games from the Stanley Cup Finals. From the year 1971 to the year 1995 no United States television network had exclusive coverage of the NHL games. The USA television network started carrying 35 regular-season games and played the full schedule of the playoff games from the year 1981 to 1985. ESPN replaced the USA network in 1985 and then Sports Channel replaced ESPN in 1989. ESPN came back and later took over the NHL contract in 1993. The Fox network joined ESPN in the year 1995. After the 1999 season, ABC, a sister network of ESPN, took over as the NHL's over-the-air broadcast partner in the U.S., a role it held until 2004. Following the 2004–05 lockout, the NHL signed a new television contract with NBC, initially with co-existing cable TV rights with OLN/Versus. In 2011, NBC and the NHL signed a new 10-year deal, and shortly after, Versus was rebranded into NBCSN following NBC's merger with Comcast. The new deal also made available all televised playoff games on a national basis, with NBC's sister networks such as CNBC and the USA Network broadcasting a limited number of playoff games. Following the 2021 season, the NHL elected to split American TV rights, with ESPN and new partner TNT inking new seven-year contracts. This deal also allows all Stanley Cup Final games to air on over-the-air television (in this case ABC), though only on even-numbered seasons.

Pop culture

Movies such as Miracle, The Mighty Ducks, Youngblood, and Soul on Ice, goon  have become part of American culture regarding hockey.

Fanbase
Ice hockey is one of the 4 major sports watched in the United States, and the U.S.-based National Hockey League is watched by many people around the world.

Ice hockey is traditionally popular in Massachusetts (and New England in general), Michigan, New York (especially Upstate New York) and Minnesota within the United States. Minnesota is known as the hockey capital of the US.

The NHL is trying to grow the sport of ice hockey by attempting to diversify the fanbase and expand from its traditional demographic. A notable example is the Chicago Blackhawks has seen a significant increase in attention from ethnic minorites groups since their Stanley cup successes in the 2010s, which has resulted in the team setting up outreach programs for urban youths and low income neighbourhoods. The Washington Capitals also have noteworthy outreach programs for to garner interest ice hockey.

The NHL has outreach programs like "Hockey is for Everyone" to make ice hockey more accessible to urban youth and low income communities.

Present day
As of the year 2015, there are over 2,000 ice rinks in the United States alone (United States, 2008). There are now 32 teams participating in the NHL, with 25 in the United States and 7 in Canada. As of spring 2014, United States has won 16 medals (gold, silver, and bronze) total.

The U.S. now has more youth hockey players than all other countries, excluding Canada, combined. The legacy of the Miracle on Ice is believed to be influential in popularizing the sport from a fringe sport to a mainstream sport.

Number of registered players by state
Number of registered hockey players, including male, female and junior, provided by USA Hockey, as of November 2022. Minnesota's total does not include the roughly 6,500 high school hockey players who are not affiliated with USA Hockey.

References

 
United States